Sir William Hill Irvine  (6 July 1858 – 20 August 1943) was an Australian politician and judge. He served as Premier of Victoria (1902–1904), Attorney-General of Australia (1913–1914), and Chief Justice of Victoria (1918–1935).

Early life
Irvine was born in Newry in County Down, Ireland, into a Scottish-Presbyterian family; he was the nephew of Irish revolutionary John Mitchel. He was educated at the Royal School, Armagh and Trinity College, Dublin, graduating in law in 1879 before migrating to Melbourne, where he taught in Presbyterian schools and read law at Melbourne University, gaining a master's degree in arts and law. He soon became a leading Melbourne barrister.

Victorian politics
In 1894, Irvine was elected to the Victorian Legislative Assembly as a Liberal. He was Attorney-General 1899–1900 and 1902–03, and Solicitor-General in 1903. He succeeded George Turner as leader of the Victorian Liberals, but was much more conservative than either Turner or the federal Protectionist Party leader, Alfred Deakin. In 1902, supported by the National Citizens' Reform League, he displaced the more liberal Alexander Peacock and became Premier and Treasurer. He held office until 1904, when he was succeeded by the similarly-minded Thomas Bent.

Irvine's ministry was appointed on 10 June 1902:
 Premier and Attorney-General : William Irvine
 Treasurer : William Shiels
 Solicitor-General : John Mark Davies
 Minister of Railways : Thomas Bent
 Minister of Education and Health : Robert Reid
 Minister of Public Works and Agriculture : John Taverner
 President of Board of Lands : Malcolm McKenzie
 Minister of Mines : Ewen Cameron
 Chief Secretary and Minister of Labour : John Murray

Federal politics
In 1906, Irvine was elected to the Australian House of Representatives for the seat of Flinders. First elected as an independent Protectionist, he became a member of Deakin's Commonwealth Liberal Party in 1908. He was Attorney-General in Joseph Cook's Liberal government of 1913–14. He was considered a potential Prime Minister of Australia, but his abrupt manner and hard-line conservatism made him unacceptable to many Liberals; in Parliament he was known as "Iceberg Irvine."

Judicial career
 
Recognising that he was unlikely to progress further in politics, Irvine accepted appointment as the Chief Justice of the Supreme Court of Victoria, the highest-ranking court in that state. He held the position from 1918 until 1935.

Other activities
He was knighted KCMG in 1914 and made GCMG in 1936. A keen motorist, he was a founding member of the Royal Automobile Club of Victoria (RACV) and was its patron from 1938 through 1943. In 1932 a painting of Irvine by Ernest Buckmaster won the Archibald Prize, Australia's best-known portrait prize.

See also
 List of Judges of the Supreme Court of Victoria

References

Sources
Geoff Browne, A Biographical Register of the Victorian Parliament, 1900–84, Government Printer, Melbourne, 1985
Don Garden, Victoria: A History, Thomas Nelson, Melbourne, 1984
Kathleen Thompson and Geoffrey Serle, A Biographical Register of the Victorian Parliament, 1856–1900, Australian National University Press, Canberra, 1972
 Raymond Wright, A People's Counsel. A History of the Parliament of Victoria, 1856–1990, Oxford University Press, Melbourne, 1992

External links 
 Supreme Court of Victoria Website
 

 

1858 births
1943 deaths
Premiers of Victoria
Attorneys-General of Australia
Members of the Cabinet of Australia
Members of the Australian House of Representatives for Flinders
Chief Justices of Victoria
Australian Knights Grand Cross of the Order of St Michael and St George
Australian politicians awarded knighthoods
People from Newry
Australian people of Scottish descent
Ulster Scots people
Members of the Victorian Legislative Assembly
Treasurers of Victoria 
Melbourne Law School alumni
Attorneys-General of the Colony of Victoria
Solicitors-General of Victoria
Free Trade Party members of the Parliament of Australia
Commonwealth Liberal Party members of the Parliament of Australia
Nationalist Party of Australia members of the Parliament of Australia
20th-century Australian politicians
Lieutenant-Governors of Victoria
Irish emigrants to colonial Australia